Nicolas Gabriel Apostol (born January 1, 1999) is a Canadian soccer player who most recently played for Cavalry FC in the Canadian Premier League.

Early life
Apostol began playing youth soccer with the Guildford Athletic Club in Surrey, playing with them from 2006 through 2011. From 2008 to 2011, he was a member of Whitecaps FC Prospects program, while still playing youth club soccer with Guildford, and in September 2011, he officially joined the Whitecaps FC Residency Program. In 2021, he joined the Vancouver Whitecaps FC U-23.

In 2017, he began attending the University of Connecticut, playing for the men's soccer team, scoring two goals in 18 games as a rookie. The following year, he departed UConn to attend Oregon State University.

Club career
In 2016, while with the Whitecaps Academy, he was called up to the second team Whitecaps FC 2 of the USL, making his debut on July 16, against San Antonio FC. The following year in 2017, he was called up again playing on May 28 against the Real Monarchs earning his first professional assist on Terran Campbell's goal.

On August 31, 2021, he signed with Cavalry FC of the Canadian Premier League. He made his debut the next day, coming on as a substitute against FC Edmonton. After the 2021 season, Cavalry announced that Apostol would leave the club after one season.

International career
In 2011, he represented Western Canada at the Danone Nations Cup.

In 2013, he earned his first call up to a youth national team camp with the U15 squad. In 2016, he played in a youth friendly against the United States, for his first international game.

Career statistics

References

External links

1999 births
Living people
Canadian soccer players
Canadian people of Romanian descent
Association football defenders
Soccer people from British Columbia
Sportspeople from Surrey, British Columbia
Canadian expatriate soccer players
Expatriate soccer players in the United States
Canadian expatriate sportspeople in the United States
Vancouver Whitecaps Residency players
Whitecaps FC 2 players
UConn Huskies men's soccer players
Cavalry FC players
United Soccer League players
Canadian Premier League players